Direct is the title of The 77s' second EP, released in 2002 on the band's own Fools of the World label.

Track listing
 "Born On Separate Days"
 "Perfect"
 "Roesbud"
 "Dig My Heels"
 "Lifeline"
 "Take Your Mind Off It"

The band
 Mike Roe - guitars and lead vocals.
 Mark Harmon - bass guitars and background vocals.
 Bruce Spencer - Drums, keyboards, percussion and vocals.

Production notes
 Art & Design - Brian Heydn.

2002 EPs
The 77s albums